The Samsung SGH-F210 is a cellphone manufactured by Samsung Electronics.

Response
Trusted Reviews rated it 7/10, criticising the small screen size., The Register gave it 73% expressing confusion about whether it was a phone or an MP3 player, and Pocket Lint gave it 3.5/5.

References

External links
 Samsung SGH-F210 specs and features at Samsung Mobile 

F210
Mobile phones introduced in 2007